Anzhela Anatoliyivna Balakhonova (born 18 December 1972) is a retired female pole vaulter from Ukraine who won the silver medal at the 1999 World Championships in Athletics. She held the European record, and formerly held the world indoor record. She finished 6th at the 2004 Summer Olympics.

Achievements

External links

1972 births
Living people
Ukrainian female pole vaulters
Athletes (track and field) at the 2000 Summer Olympics
Athletes (track and field) at the 2004 Summer Olympics
Olympic athletes of Ukraine
World Athletics Championships medalists
European Athletics Championships medalists
European champions for Ukraine
Competitors at the 1998 Goodwill Games